The 1986 Women's Hockey World Cup was the sixth edition of the Women's Hockey World Cup, an international field hockey tournament. It was held from 15 to 24 August 1986 in Amstelveen, Netherlands.

Netherlands won the tournament for the fourth time after defeating West Germany 3–0 in the final.

Results

Preliminary round

Pool A

Pool B

Ninth to twelfth place classification

Crossover

Eleventh and twelfth place

Ninth and tenth place

Fifth to eighth place classification

Crossover

Seventh and eighth place

Fifth and sixth place

First to fourth place classification

Semi-finals

Third and fourth place

Final

Statistics

Final standings

Goalscorers

References

External links

Official FIH website

Women's Hockey World Cup
Hockey World Cup
World Cup
International women's field hockey competitions hosted by the Netherlands
Sports competitions in Amstelveen
Hockey World Cup